Solanum myriacanthum (syn. Solanum khasianum), the Himalayan nightshade, is a species of flowering plant in the family Solanaceae. It is native to Mexico and Central America, and has been introduced to Cuba, Nepal, Assam and Myanmar. It may be invasive in the southeastern United States

References

myriacanthum
Flora of Mexico
Flora of Central America
Plants described in 1813